Sir William Slater Brown (1844–1917) was an early 20th century Scottish businessman who served as Lord Provost of Edinburgh from 1909 to 1912.

Life

He was born in 1844 the second son of Henry Raeburn Brown (b.1806) a tailor, and his wife Helen Clyde.

In later life he lived at 17 Dean Terrace in the Stockbridge district of Edinburgh.

In 1909 he succeeded James Puckering Gibson as Lord Provost of Edinburgh.

During his period of office his duties included laying the foundation stone on Portobello Town Hall. As with Leith the building of a Town Hall was an odd gesture as Portobello had ceased to be an independent town and was then part of Edinburgh. Brown was knighted in the second year of his provostship by King George V.

He was succeeded as Lord Provost by Robert Kirk Inches in 1912.

He died on 19 April 1917 and is buried in Warriston Cemetery.

Family
He was married to Margaret Dods around 1865 and they had six children including Henry Raeburn Brown (b.1869).

Artistic recognition

He was portrayed in his Lord Provost robes by George Fiddes Watt.

References
 

1844 births
1917 deaths
Lord Provosts of Edinburgh